Ahar County is in East Azerbaijan province, Iran. The capital of the county is the city of Ahar. At the 2006 census, the county's population was 147,781 in 34,067 households. The following census in 2011 counted 150,111 people in 39,715 households. At the 2016 census, the county's population was 154,530 in 46,202 households, after which Hurand District was separated from the county to form Hurand County.

Administrative divisions

The population history and structural changes of Ahar County's administrative divisions over three consecutive censuses are shown in the following table. The latest census shows two districts, nine rural districts, and two cities.

After the 2016 census, Fandoqlu District was established and divided into the rural districts of Naqduz and Qeshlaq.

Castles 
 Poshtab Castle

References

 

Counties of East Azerbaijan Province